Heteroponera is a genus of ants in the subfamily Heteroponerinae. The genus is known from the Neotropics (from Costa Rica to Uruguay and Chile) and Australasia.

Species

Heteroponera angulata Borgmeier, 1959
Heteroponera brounii (Forel, 1892)
Heteroponera carinifrons Mayr, 1887
Heteroponera crozieri Taylor, 2011
Heteroponera darlingtonorum Taylor, 2015
Heteroponera dentinodis (Mayr, 1887)
Heteroponera dolo (Roger, 1860)
Heteroponera ecarinata Taylor, 2015
Heteroponera flava Kempf, 1962
Heteroponera georgesi Perrault, 1999
Heteroponera imbellis (Emery, 1895)
Heteroponera inca Brown, 1958
Heteroponera inermis (Emery, 1894)
Heteroponera leae (Wheeler, 1923)
Heteroponera lioprocta Taylor, 2015
Heteroponera majeri Taylor, 2011
Heteroponera mayri Kempf, 1962
Heteroponera microps Borgmeier, 1957
Heteroponera monteithi Taylor, 2015
Heteroponera monticola Kempf & Brown, 1970
Heteroponera panamensis (Forel, 1899)
Heteroponera pendergrasti Taylor, 2015
Heteroponera relicta (Wheeler, 1915)
Heteroponera rhodopygea Taylor, 2015
Heteroponera robusta Kempf, 1962
Heteroponera trachypyx Taylor, 2015
Heteroponera viviennae Taylor, 2015
Heteroponera wilsoni Taylor, 2015

References

External links

Heteroponerinae
Ant genera